The Virginia state forest system includes 26 state-managed forests covering a total of . They are managed by the Virginia Department of Forestry.

The system was created to manage and maintain forests for wildlife, timber production, recreation, water quality, and aesthetics. The system receives no taxpayer funds, and is self-supported by the sale of forest products.

Most Virginia state forests are accessible to the public. Activities such as hiking, biking, horseback riding, hunting, and fishing are permitted in some state forests; permissible uses vary between individual state forests. Some activities require the purchase of a "State Forest Use Permit" for individuals ages 16 or older.

State forests in the Commonwealth of Virginia
The following table lists Virginia's 26 state forests .

See also
List of U.S. National Forests
List of Virginia state parks
List of Virginia Natural Area Preserves
List of Virginia Wildlife Management Areas

References

External links
Virginia Department of Forestry.gov: Virginia State Forests website

.
Forests of Virginia
Protected areas of Virginia
Virginia
State forests
Environment of Virginia